Fazuan Abdullah (born 11 December 1984) is a Malaysian footballer currently playing for T-Team in Malaysia Super League as a midfielder.

External links
 Fazuan Abdullah at Stadium Astro
 Profile at www.T-Team.com.my

References

1984 births
Living people
Malaysian footballers
Terengganu F.C. II players
Malaysian people of Malay descent
Association football midfielders